James Starr may refer to:

 James Harper Starr (1809–1890), namesake of Starr County in Texas
 James Starr (philatelist) (1870–1948), American philatelist
 H. James Starr (1931–2009), American politician